Norbert Brunner (born 1969, Hohenems, Austria) is an Austrian object, conceptual and installation artist.

Norbert Brunner was born in Hohenems, Vorarlberg Austria. After being raised in Vorarlberg he served a joinery apprenticeship and attended a vocational school for sculpture in Elbigenalp, Tyrol. He studied sculpting on the University of Applied Arts Vienna with professor Wander Bertoni. He also had been influenced by Oswald Oberhuber, Bernhard Leitner, Franz Graf and Isabelle Graw.

Brunner has public projects in Kobe, Japan; Edmonton, Canada and Birmington, UK. His work has been exhibited throughout the world including Beijing, China; Sydney, Australia; London, UK; Moscow, Russia; Berlin, Germany; Paris, France; Vienna, Graz, Austria; Geneva, Swiss; Prague, Czech; New York City, Dallas, USA; Osaka, Nagoya, Kyoto, Japan and Sydney, Australia. He also participated in the biennale in Valencia and the architecture biennale in Beijing, the expo Aichi in Nagoya and the Royal Academy of Art Summer Exhibition.

His works are part of important museum collections like the 21 Haus in Vienna, the New Britain Museum of American Art and the Vorarlberger Landesmuseum.

Exhibitions / Installations (selection)

References

Publications
Norbert Brunner by Oliver Goetz, Triton Verlag, 2003

External links

Official website
Official Twitter

1969 births
Living people
Abstract artists
Conceptual artists
New media artists
Austrian installation artists
Artists from Vienna